Ayiroor may refer to the following locations in the Indian state of Kerala:
Ayiroor, Thiruvananthapuram, village in Thiruvananthapuram district
Ayiroor, Pathanamthitta, village in Pathanamthitta district
Ayiroor, Ernakulam, village in Ernakulam district
Ayiroor, Malappuram, village in Malappuram district